Diane Maura Rosenbaum (born November 26, 1949) is an American politician in the US state of Oregon who was the majority leader of the Oregon State Senate. She was a Democratic member of the Oregon House of Representatives, representing District 42 (Southeast Portland) from 1998 to 2009. She served as speaker pro tempore. In the 2008 elections, she ran unopposed for the Oregon State Senate, replacing Kate Brown, who was elected secretary of state. She won reelection to District 21 in 2012 after defeating Republican Cliff Hutchison.

After Governor John Kitzhaber resigned in February 2015, elevating Brown to the governorship, Rosenbaum was named by The Oregonian as a potential secretary of state. In 2023, Rosenbaum temporarily replaced County Chair Jessica Vega Pederson on the Multnomah County Board of Commissioners. A new commissioner will be elected in the May 2023 election, who will replace Rosenbaum (who will not be running for election).

References

External links
Oregon State House – Diane Rosenbaum official government website
Project Vote Smart – Representative Diane Rosenbaum (OR) profile
Follow the Money – Diane M. Rosenbaum
2006 2004 2002 2000 1998 campaign contributions

1949 births
Living people
Democratic Party members of the Oregon House of Representatives
Democratic Party Oregon state senators
Women state legislators in Oregon
21st-century American politicians
21st-century American women politicians